The Bay Area Dragons are a professional basketball team in the East Asia Super League. Based in Hong Kong, the team is meant to represent the Greater China region.

History
The Dragons were originally formed as the Bay Area Chun Yu Phoenixes, a franchise team for the East Asia Super League, representing Greater China. Hong Kong was made as the home venue of the Phoenixes. Both the Phoenixes and the P. League+ champions of Taiwan were designated by the EASL as Greater China's representatives.

The team was established under the agreement of the Hong Kong Basketball Association and Chun Yu Basketball Club. The Phoenixes are the only franchise team in the EASL, with other participating teams seeded from domestic leagues from Japan, Taiwan, South Korea and the Philippines.

Former Chinese Basketball Association general manager Liu Quansheng was appointed as the team's first general manager.

They entered the 2022–23 PBA Commissioner's Cup of the Philippine Basketball Association as a guest team. The team also changed their name to the Bay Area Dragons upon joining the PBA, to avoid confusion with the Phoenix Super LPG Fuel Masters. In May 2022, former NBL coach and incumbent Australia Boomers head coach Brian Goorjian was announced as the team's first head coach.

The Bay Area Dragons reached the 2022–23 PBA Commissioner's Cup Finals, becoming the fourth guest team to reach the last stage of a PBA competition. However, they would lose to the Barangay Ginebra San Miguel, 4–3.

Roster

Honours
Philippine Basketball Association (PBA)
Runners-up (1): 2022–23 (Commissioner's Cup)

References

External links
Bay Area Dragons – East Asia Super League Profile 

2021 establishments in Hong Kong
basketball teams established in 2021
Basketball teams in Hong Kong